) is a municipality in the province of Barcelona, Catalonia, Spain. It is situated on the coast between Montgat and Premià de Mar, to the north-east of the city of Barcelona, in the comarca (county) of el Maresme. The town is both a tourist centre and a dormitory town in the Barcelona Metropolitan Area.

The main N-II road and a RENFE railway line run through the town, while a local road links it with the A-19 autopista at 
Alella.

The town center has buildings in a wide range of styles: neoclassical, modernista, noucentista 
and simply eclectic. The municipal museum has collections of archeology and of Catalan ceramics, and there is also a private 
museum of pharmacy and medicine.  A Roman village called Cal Ros de les Cabres was one of the first settlements located on the site of the current
town.

The agriculture of El Masnou is mainly of flowers, especially carnations, and the industry has a predominance of textile, with several industries about ceramics, glass and pharmaceutical products.

Demography

Historical and interesting buildings 
 Casa de la Vila. Neoclassical style town hall of the architect Miquel Garriga i Roca.
 Museu Cusí de Farmàcia. Museum of Pharmacy which is the exponent of the historical and museological vocation of a pharmacist, Joaquim Cusí and Furtunet.
 El Masnou Municipal Nautical Museum. Museum which permanent exhibition is organised around the relationship between the town of El Masnou and the sea.
 Casa del Marquès del Masnou. This building belonged to Romà Fabra i Puig, who received the title of Marquis of El Masnou in 1922.

Notable people
Current basketball star Ricky Rubio was born in El Masnou. Also Bruno Saltor Grau, a professional football coach and former player who is currently a coach for Chelsea.

Other famous people who were born in El Masnou are:
 Ricky Rubio  (1990), First round draft pick of the NBA. 
 Fèlix Oliver (1856 – 1932), a pioneer of cinema in Uruguay.
 Lluís Millet i Pagès (1867–1941), musician, founder of the Catalan choir Orfeó Català.
 Rosa Sensat (1873 – 1961), teacher who contributed to the development of the Catalan public schools during the first third of the 20th century.
 Jordi Pericot i Canaleta (1931), plastic artist and designer.
 Jordi Pagans i Monsalvatje (1932-2017), contemporary figurative painter, cousin of the renowned classical music composer Xavier Montsalvatge i Bassols.

References

 Panareda Clopés, Josep Maria; Rios Calvet, Jaume; Rabella Vives, Josep Maria (1989). Guia de Catalunya, Barcelona: Caixa de Catalunya.  (Spanish).  (Catalan).

External links

Official website 
 Government data pages 
Historic-artistic heritage 

Municipalities in Maresme